Bäckebo is a locality situated in Nybro Municipality, Kalmar County, Sweden, with 219 inhabitants in 2010. It is known for the World War II Bäckebo rocket incident, in which the test flight of a German V-2 rocket, bound for Denmark, went astray and exploded above a cornfield near the hamlet of Gräsdals.

Gallery

References 

Populated places in Kalmar County
Populated places in Nybro Municipality